Maxim Hermaniuk  (30 October 1911 – 3 May 1996) was the Ukrainian Catholic Archbishop of Winnipeg.

Born in Nove Selo near Horodok in western Ukraine, he was ordained a Priest of Congregation of the Most Holy Redeemer in 1938. In 1956, he was appointed Ukrainian Catholic Archbishop of Winnipeg by Pope Pius XII. He retired in 1992.

In 1982, he was made an Officer of the Order of Canada.

References

External links
 Maxim Hermaniuk at the Catholic-Hierarchy
 The Ukrainian Catholic Metropolitanate of Canada

Participants in the Second Vatican Council
1911 births
1996 deaths
People from Lviv Oblast
People from the Kingdom of Galicia and Lodomeria
Officers of the Order of Canada
Ukrainian emigrants to Canada
Eastern Catholic bishops in Canada
Bishops of the Ukrainian Greek Catholic Church
Canadian Eastern Catholics
Austro-Hungarian emigrants to Canada
Ukrainian Austro-Hungarians
Redemptorist bishops
Eastern Catholic archeparchs in North America